Vivek Hallegere Murthy (born July 10, 1977) is an American physician and a vice admiral in the United States Public Health Service Commissioned Corps who has served as the 19th and 21st surgeon general of the United States under Presidents Obama, Trump, and Biden. Murthy is the first surgeon general of Indian descent, and, during his first term as surgeon general, he was the youngest active duty flag officer in federal uniformed service. 

Murthy co-chaired President-elect Joe Biden's COVID-19 Advisory Board from November 2020 to January 2021, alongside former Food and Drug Administration commissioner David A. Kessler and Yale public health professor Marcella Nunez-Smith. On December 7, Biden announced Murthy would return to the role of U.S. surgeon general. The United States Senate confirmed Murthy to the role on March 23, 2021, by a vote of 57–43. In October 2022, Biden nominated Murthy to be the U.S. representative on the World Health Organization's executive board.

Early life and education
Murthy was born in Huddersfield, Yorkshire to immigrants from Karnataka, India. He is the grandson of the late H. C. Narayana Murthy, the former director of Mysore Sugar Company, and son of Florida-based H. N. Lakshminarasimha Murthy and Maithreya Murthy. In 1978, the family crossed the Atlantic to Newfoundland, where his father worked as a district medical officer. When he was three years old, the family relocated to Miami, and his parents established their medical practice.

Murthy was raised and completed his early education in Miami, graduating as valedictorian from Miami Palmetto Senior High School in 1994. He then attended college at Harvard University and graduated magna cum laude in 1997 with a bachelor of arts in biochemical sciences. In 2003, Murthy earned an MD from Yale School of Medicine and an MBA from Yale School of Management, where he received The Paul & Daisy Soros Fellowships for New Americans.

During his time at Yale, Murthy helped start "The Healer's Art" – a four-week long elective in which medical students discuss critical topics such as what it means to serve as a healer, how to cope with losing a patient, and how to prevent physician burnout. This course – available at only Yale and UCSF at the time – is now offered by over 70 medical schools across the United States.

Career

Undergraduate years
While a Harvard freshman in 1995, Murthy co-founded VISIONS Worldwide, which he led for eight years. The nonprofit organization focused on HIV/AIDS education in the U.S. and India. In 1997, he co-founded the Swasthya Community Health Partnership to train women as community health workers and educators in rural India.

Medical career
Murthy completed his internal medicine residency at Brigham and Women's Hospital and Harvard Medical School. As an attending physician at Brigham and Women's Hospital, Murthy cared for thousands of patients while assisting in the education of hundreds of undergraduates, medical students, and residents.

In 2008, Murthy founded and served as president of Doctors for America, a group of more than 15,000 physicians and medical students supporting high quality affordable care for all.

In 2011, Murthy was appointed by Barack Obama to serve on the Presidential Advisory Council on Prevention, Health Promotion, and Integrative and Public Health within the Department of Health and Human Services. The group advises the National Prevention Council on developing strategies and partnerships to advance the nation's health through prevention. In 2012, Murthy worked as co-chair of Obama's health care advisory committee during his re-election campaign.

Murthy is also the co-founder and chairman of TrialNetworks, a cloud-based Clinical Trial Optimization System for pharmaceutical and biotechnology trials that improves the quality and efficiency of clinical trials to bring new drugs to market faster and more safely. He founded the company as Epernicus in 2008, originally, to be a collaborative networking web platform for scientists to boost research productivity.

Surgeon General of the United States

In November 2013, Murthy was nominated by President Obama for the post of United States surgeon general. His nomination met resistance in the Senate by some Democrats, Republicans, and the National Rifle Association regarding previous comments Murthy made declaring gun violence as a threat to public health.

Murthy's nomination received broad support from more than 100 medical and public health organizations in the U.S. He received the endorsements of two former surgeons general: David Satcher and Regina Benjamin. Another former surgeon general, Richard Carmona opposed the appointment based on Murthy's age.

On December 15, 2014, Murthy's appointment as surgeon general was approved in a 51–43 Senate vote.

From the beginning of his tenure, Murthy spoke about the importance of creating a culture of prevention in America, one that is grounded in physical activity, nutrition, and emotional well-being. As part of this effort, he issued Step It Up! The Surgeon General's Call to Action to Promote Walking and Walkable Communities. For the one-year anniversary of the Call to Action, he led a two-week public-private partnership with Fitbit called the Step it Up Challenge that engaged more than 600,000 people to increase their physical activity with an industry record-setting 60 billion steps. He also partnered with Elmo and Top Chef to inform the country about vaccines and healthy eating, respectively. Murthy's 2016 surgeon general report on e-cigarette use among youths emphasized the vulnerability of young people to the products and recommended that e-cigarettes be incorporated into existing smoke-free policies to prevent youth from accessing e-cigarettes. The report drew heated response from proponents of e-cigarettes, including R Street and other public policy groups.

Murthy also led the United States through several major health crises – including the Ebola and Zika viruses, the Flint Michigan water crisis, and the currently ongoing opioid epidemic. Murthy released the first ever Surgeon General's report on Alcohol, Drugs, and Health – which revealed that approximately 21 million Americans suffer from some form of substance abuse disorder. Furthermore, in 2016, Murthy issued a historic letter to 2.3 million fellow healthcare professionals, requesting a pledge to reform the prescription of opiate drugs and the perception of those struggling with addiction. In this letter, Murthy argues that addiction is "a chronic illness, not a moral failing." Additionally, Murthy has worked on the effects of climate change on the country's health. In a 2016 interview, he stated "by the end of the century, we are looking at an increase of tens of thousands of illnesses and death episodes because of climate change." Murthy has also spoken out against conversion therapy, stating that "conversion therapy is not sound medical practice... we all need to work together to build greater understanding and acceptance throughout our society."

On April 21, 2017, Murthy was relieved of his duties as 19th Surgeon General by President Donald Trump. His deputy surgeon general, Rear Admiral Sylvia Trent-Adams, was named acting surgeon general. In a parting address, Murthy stated "for the grandson of a poor farmer from India to be asked by the President to look out for the health of an entire nation was a humbling and unique American story. I will always be grateful to our country for welcoming my immigrant family nearly 40 years ago and giving me this opportunity to serve."

On December 3, 2020, Politico reported that Murthy had been nominated by President-elect Joe Biden to return to the role of Surgeon General. His nomination was sent to the Senate on January 20, 2021 and confirmed on March 23, 2021, by a vote of 57–43. As surgeon general, Murthy leads a force of 6,700 public health officers, with the mission of delivering exceptional care to medically underserved populations both within the United States and abroad.

Public engagement

Since 2017, Murthy has appeared on various television and radio shows talking about the problem of loneliness, and he has written numerous articles on the subject. Murthy states he was shocked by how often he encountered people suffering from severe loneliness during his medical career, and argued that loneliness in America has become prevalent enough to count as an "epidemic". Murthy sees loneliness as a root cause that plays a substantial role in many other social problems. In April 2020 he published a book about what both society and ordinary people as individuals, can do to reduce loneliness in themselves and others, entitled Together: The Healing Power of Human Connection in a Sometimes Lonely World.

Subsequent career
Murthy spoke during the 2020 Democratic National Convention.

On September 5, 2020, Murthy joined the advisory council of the Biden-Harris Transition Team, which was planning the presidential transition of Joe Biden. On November 9, Murthy was announced as one of the three co-chairs of then-President-Elect Biden's coronavirus advisory board, alongside former FDA commissioner David A. Kessler and Yale public health professor Marcella Nunez-Smith. Days later, Murthy was named a candidate for United States secretary of health and human services in the Biden administration.

Before his Senate confirmation, Murthy disclosed a total of 1.7 million dollars in consulting for Netflix ($547,500), Airbnb ($410,000), Carnival Cruise Line ($400,000), Estee Lauder ($292,500). He also disclosed hundreds of thousands of dollars in speaking fees from dozens of organizations, for example "$30,000 from Duke University Kenan Institute for Ethics for a speech I gave in January 2021."

In July 2021, Murthy publicly stated there is "no value" in incarcerating people for cannabis use.

Awards and decorations
Murthy's awards include:

Personal life
Murthy is married to Alice Chen, an internist who trained at Yale, Cornell and UCLA, and was the executive director of Doctors for America. They have two children.

On February 18, 2022, Murthy revealed on Twitter that he, his wife, and five-year-old son have all been infected by COVID-19. Earlier in the same week, Murthy revealed that his four-year-old daughter had been infected. All had mild symptoms and no breathing issues.

References

External links

 
 

|-

1977 births
Living people
American physicians of Indian descent
Florida Democrats
Harvard University alumni
People from Huddersfield
Obama administration personnel
Surgeons General of the United States
United States Public Health Service Commissioned Corps officers
United States Public Health Service Commissioned Corps admirals
United States Public Health Service personnel
Biden administration personnel
Yale School of Management alumni
Yale School of Medicine alumni
Miami Palmetto Senior High School alumni
American people of Kannada descent
Members of the National Academy of Medicine
21st-century American physicians